Jochen Feilcke is a German politician of the Christian Democratic Union (CDU) and former member of the German Bundestag.

Life 
In 1964 Feilcke became a member of the CDU. From 1967 to 1971 he was initially a member of the Junge Union Berlin-Schöneberg, from 1970 to 1982 he was chairman of the local association Innsbrucker Platz, in 1977 he became chairman of the district association Schöneberg and in 1981 he became a member of the regional board of the CDU Berlin. From 1975 to 1983, Feilcke was a member of the German Bundestag from 1983 to 1998.

References 

1942 births
Living people
Members of the Bundestag for Berlin
Members of the Bundestag 1994–1998
Members of the Bundestag 1990–1994
Members of the Bundestag 1987–1990
Members of the Bundestag 1983–1987
Members of the Bundestag for the Christian Democratic Union of Germany